El Rostro de Analía (The Face of Analía) is a Spanish-language telenovela produced by the American-based television network NBC. It stars Elizabeth Gutiérrez, Martin Karpan, Maritza Rodríguez and Gabriel Porras, with the special appearance of Gaby Espino. Written by Venezuelan writer Humberto "Kiko" Olivieri, the story is loosely based on María, María which starred Alba Roversi and Mexican soap star Arturo Peniche in Venezuela, and was also written by Olivieri. The novela is directed by David Posada and Danny Gaviria; with Jairo Arcila as General Producer and Aurelio Valcárcel Carroll as Executive Producer. Although the novela was set in Los Angeles, NBC filmed the serial in Miami, Fl. Through editing it was made to appear as Los Angeles. The network debuted it on October 20, 2008 at the 9 pm (8 pm central) timeslot. NBC added English subtitles as closed captions on CC3 starting in March.

Elizabeth Gutiérrez plays both Mariana and Analía, being the protagonist. The male lead is portrayed by Martin Karpan, while the antagonists include Maritza Rodríguez, Gabriel Porras and Zully Montero. Other major characters are brought to life by Karla Monroig, Daniel Lugo, Ximena Duque, Pedro Moreno and Alejandro Chaban.

Plot 
Mariana Montiel is a young and beautiful executive at the head of ANGEL'S, the executive airline founded by her father. She has been skilled and very shrewd in business but in love she is completely different, since she failed to protect one thing that she loves most: her own marriage. Since she met and fell in love with the good-looking and brilliant architect Daniel Montiel with whom she had a passionate affair that resulted beautiful Adriana, a baby who was a reason of two of them getting married. Marriage in its first phase was happy, Mariana gave all trust to her husband, helping company growth, but Daniel took the rise of his career to continue his single life quoted. Sarah, Mariana's beautiful and sexy cousin, who was always jealous of living in Mariana's shadow, took advantage of Daniel's opportunity, becoming his mistress. Sarah's life goal would be taking Mariana's company position in Angel's. Behind her sophisticated appearance hides an unscrupulous woman, who just wants to get money and power, so she becomes entangled in the affairs of the drug mafia and Ricky Montana, who seeks to use the image of the Airline to launder money. As Sarah's ambition has no limits, she plans to kill her with help of her accomplice Ricky Montana. Montana, as a way to test the loyalty of his lover Analía, who is in fact an undercover agent, orders her to kill Mariana. Analía accepts, but she has no intention to really kill her. Her life goal is to trap Montana, and put him on the electric chair, so she could revenge him for murdering the love of her life. That day, Mariana discovers her husband's infidelity and in a fit of madness and pain, she leaves her anniversary party. Analía gets into her car with the gun to allegedly kill her, but Mariana's car, which was broken, rolls of a cliff. Dr. Armando Rivera and his assistant sees a woman with burned skin and they run to help her. Dr. Armando finds a picture of Analía and decides to rebuild her face, using an experimental procedure of cloning, not knowing that the girl is actually Mariana. Everyone believes that Mariana no longer exists, and her husband and family are destroyed by that fact. Montana trusts Analía again, but he is devastated by the fact that she is not appearing. Armando finds out that Analía was a drug trafficker, stripper and that she was accused for murder, not knowing that she was actually undercover agent, so he decides not to tell her his real identity, because he doesn't know that the girl is Mariana. He calls her Ana, and he doesn't allow her to leave the house. One day she escapes and saves drowning child on the beach confronting her daughter and husband again, but Mariana in the body of Analía doesn't remember them. They fall in love again. Mariana Montiel returns home as her own daughter's nanny, but the criminal history of the true "Analía" will not allow her to be happy. She must live carrying forth the life and crimes of the woman whose face she carries − The Face of Analía.

Cast

References

External links 
  
 Telemundo official press release 
 

2008 telenovelas
2009 telenovelas
2008 American television series debuts
2009 American television series endings
Spanish-language American telenovelas
Telemundo telenovelas
Television shows set in Los Angeles
Television shows set in Miami